James Reid (born 1 August 1992) is a South African mountain bike racer. He rode at the cross-country event at the 2016 Summer Olympics. He finished in 42nd place after crashing out.

References

South African male cyclists
Cyclists at the 2016 Summer Olympics
Olympic cyclists of South Africa
1992 births
Living people
20th-century South African people
21st-century South African people